The independence of Bangladesh was declared on 26 March 1971 at the onset of the Bangladesh Liberation War by Bangabandhu Sheikh Mujibur Rahman; the following day the declaration was broadcast by Major Ziaur Rahman in a radio broadcast.  On 10 April, the Provisional Government of Bangladesh issued a proclamation on the basis of the previous declaration and established an interim constitution for the independence movement.

First declarations
On 25 March 1971, negotiations between Pakistani President Yahya Khan and Awami League leader Sheikh Mujibur Rahman broke down after Khan refused to accept Rahman's plan for a new federal constitution in Pakistan. Rahman's party won an absolute majority in the National Assembly during Pakistan's first free election in 1970. However, the newly elected parliament was barred from taking power due to objections from the Pakistani military and the West Pakistan establishment. The Awami League's 6 points proposal for a Pakistani federation was strongly opposed by bureaucrats and senior politicians like Zulfikar Ali Bhutto in West Pakistan. The League initiated a civil disobedience campaign in East Pakistan to press for convening the parliament, amid rising Bengali aspirations for self-determination and independence. On 7 March 1971, Rahman addressed a huge pro-independence rally in Dhaka. Yahya Khan and Bhutto were in the city throughout March for negotiations. The political process was abruptly ended by President Khan, who faced pressure from the military for a crackdown.

In the evening of 25 March, Mujib convened a meeting of senior Bengali nationalist leaders, including Tajuddin Ahmad and Colonel M A G Osmani, at his residence in Dhanmondi. They were briefed by Bengali insiders within the military of an impending crackdown. They implored Mujib to declare independence but Mujib declined to do so fearing he would be tried for treason. Tajuddin Ahmed even brought all the recording instruments but had failed to convince Mujib to record independence declaration. Rather Mujib ordered all the high ups to flee to India. However, Mujib decided to remain in Dhaka in hope of coming to a negotiated compromise with West Pakistan in becoming the Prime Minister of the whole Pakistan.

On the night of 25 March, the Pakistan Armed Forces launched Operation Searchlight in the capital of East Pakistan. Tanks rolled out on the streets of Dhaka. The troops were said to have massacred students and intellectuals in Dhaka University, as well as many civilians in other parts of the city. It set major cities" ablaze and crushed resistance from the police and the East Pakistan Rifles.

At midnight on 26 March 1971, Sheikh Mujibur Rahman sent a message about attacks on EPR and police barracks in Dhaka, and declared the independence of Bangladesh through a telegram. The telegram was sent to Chittagong, where Awami League leader M. A. Hannan and Major Ziaur Rahman of the East Bengal Regiment broadcast the message on radio on behalf of Mujib. The declaration of independence was widely reported in newspapers around the world. As per the sixth schedule of the Constitution of Bangladesh, the text of Mujib's telegram stated the following.

This may be my last message, from today Bangladesh is independent. I call upon the people of Bangladesh wherever you might be and with whatever you have, to resist the army of occupation to the last. Your fight must go on until the last soldier of the Pakistan occupation army is expelled from the soil of Bangladesh and final victory is achieved.

Mujib's telegram was widely reported on radio on 26 March 1971. M. A. Hannan, secretary of the Awami League in Chittagong, read out the statement in Bengali at 2.30 pm and 7.40 pm from a radio station in Chittagong. The text of the Hannan's broadcast stated the following.

Today Bangladesh is a sovereign and independent country. On Thursday night [March 25, 1971], West Pakistan armed forces suddenly attacked the police barracks at Razarbagh and the EPR headquarters at Pilkhana in Dhaka. Many innocent and unarmed have been killed in Dhaka city and other places of Bangladesh. Violent clashes between EPR and police on the one hand and the armed forces of Pakistan on the other are going on. The Bengalis are fighting the enemy with great courage for an independent Bangladesh. May Allah aid us in our fight for freedom. Joy Bangla.

On 27 March 1971, Major Ziaur Rahman broadcast Mujib's message in English which was drafted by Abul Kashem Khan. Zia's message stated the following.

This is Swadhin Bangla Betar Kendra. I, Major Ziaur Rahman, on behalf of Bangabandhu Sheikh Mujibur Rahman, hereby declare that the independent People's Republic of Bangladesh has been established. I call upon all Bengalis to rise against the attack by the West Pakistani Army. We shall fight to the last to free our motherland. By the grace of Allah, victory is ours.

On 10 April 1971, the Provisional Government of Bangladesh issued the Proclamation of Independence which confirmed Mujib's original declaration of independence. The proclamation also included the term Bangabandhu for the first time in a legal instrument. The proclamation stated the following. 

Bangabandhu Sheikh Mujibur Rahman, the undisputed leader of the 75 million people of Bangladesh, in due fulfillment of the legitimate right of self-determination of the people of Bangladesh, duly made a declaration of independence at Dacca on 26 March 1971, and urged the people of Bangladesh to defend the honour and integrity of Bangladesh.

According to A K Khandker, who served as Deputy Chief of Staff of the Bangladesh Armed Forces during the Liberation War; Sheikh Mujib avoided a radio broadcast fearing that it might be used as evidence of treason by the Pakistani military against him during his trial. This view is also supported in a book written by the daughter of Tajuddin Ahmed.

Constituent Assembly
On 10 April 1971, the Provisional Government of Bangladesh was formed in Mujibnagar. It converted the elected Bengali members of the national and provincial assemblies of Pakistan into the Constituent Assembly of Bangladesh. The constituent assembly issued a second proclamation of independence, which also served as the fundamental law of Bangladesh until the adoption of the constitution in 1972. This proclamation was drafted by Barrister M Amir-ul Islam and reviewed by Indian Barrister Subrata Roy Chowdhury. The text is given in the following:-

Controversy

See also
 History of Bangladesh

References

External links
 American intelligence reports on Bangladeshi Declaration of Independence

1971 documents
March 1971 events in Bangladesh
Declarations of independence
Bangladesh Liberation War
Bangladeshi documents